Son of Zorn is an American animated/live action sitcom created by Reed Agnew and Eli Jorné for Fox. The series stars Cheryl Hines, Johnny Pemberton, Tim Meadows, Artemis Pebdani, and Jason Sudeikis as the voice of Zorn. Son of Zorn is a joint production by Agnew Jorné Productions, Lord Miller Productions, and 20th Television.

Premise
The series takes place in an alternate world where traditional animated characters co-exist with real-world humans. Zorn is a barbarian warrior from the fictional island of Zephyria who moves to Orange County, California, to reconnect with his ex-wife and teenage son Alangulon, "Alan" for short.

Within the show, Zorn and things native to Zephyria are animated, following the style of He-Man and the Masters of the Universe, while the rest of the world is live-action. The series' opening title cards are rendered in the style of fantasy cartoons of the 1980s such as He-Man and ThunderCats.

Cast

 Jason Sudeikis as the voice of Zorn, a barbarian warrior from the South Pacific fantasy island Zephyria of which he is the defender since 1971. He is Alan's father and Edie's ex-husband. As Zephyria's defender, Zorn and his allies defended it from threats that have included but are not limited to Glombeasts, Lava Monsters, Vampires, and Liberal Media. In Orange County, he gets a job in phone sales at Sanitation Solutions. Zorn is also a parody of He-Man.
 Dan Lippert as Zorn's live action stand-in, whose performance is replaced by animation.
Cheryl Hines as Edie Bennett, Zorn's ex-wife and Alan's mother.
 Johnny Pemberton as Alangulon "Alan" Bennett, the titular character who is the vegetarian half-Zephyrian son of Zorn and Edie.
 Tim Meadows as Craig Ross, Edie's fiancé and an online college professor and psychologist. 
 Artemis Pebdani as Linda Orvend, Zorn's boss at Sanitation Solutions in Orange County. Linda is later demoted by Blake Erickson, although she returns to her original position in the series finale following Todd's resignation.

Recurring cast
 Mark Proksch as Todd McDonald, Zorn's co-worker at Sanitation Solutions.
 Tony Revolori as Scott Schmidt, Alan's best friend.
 Clara Mamet as Layla Green, Alan's love interest.
 Rob Riggle as the voice of Headbutt Man, a hard-headed ally of Zorn from Zephyria. Headbutt Man has a daughter named Headbutt Girl and has previously lost his wife and son to the Zephyrian monsters that he and the rest of Zorn's allies fight. He is a parody of Ram Man.
 Nick Offerman as the voice of Dr. Klorpins, a furry goblin-like creature from the western part of Zephyria who is Zorn's doctor.

Production
The show was created by Reed Agnew and Eli Jorné who wrote the pilot episode while Eric Appel directed. Initially Agnew and Jorne were set to be co-showrunners, however after Fox ordered the series to air Agnew backed out and was made co-executive producer instead. At this point, Sally McKenna was brought in to replace Agnew; McKenna would later, in April 2016, become the sole showrunner after Jorne also left the project.

Artemis Pebdani and Tim Meadows' casting was announced in July 2015, with Jason Sudeikis, Cheryl Hines, and Johnny Pemberton's involvement announced the following November.

Cancellation
On May 11, 2017, the series was cancelled after one season.

Episodes

Reception
On Rotten Tomatoes, the series holds a 58% approval rating based on 38 critics, and a 6.3/10 rating. The critical consensus reads: "Son of Zorn earns points for originality, a talented cast, and intermittent laughs, but they aren't quite enough to prop up a gimmick that's still in search of a workable premise for an ongoing series." On Metacritic, the show holds a score of 57 out of 100 based on 19 critical reviews, indicating "mixed or average reviews".

References

External links
 

2010s American high school television series
2010s American single-camera sitcoms
2016 American television series debuts
2017 American television series endings
American fantasy television series
American television series with live action and animation
English-language television shows
Fox Broadcasting Company original programming
Television series about dysfunctional families
Television series about teenagers
Television series by 20th Century Fox Television
Television series by Fox Television Animation
Television series set in fictional countries
Television shows set in Orange County, California